Graveyard Shift (also titled Central Park Drifter) is a 1987 Canadian horror film written and directed by Jerry Ciccoritti, and starring Michael A. Miranda (billed as Silvio Oliviero) and Helen Papas. The film was originally entitled Graveyard Shift but when the film was released to video, the title was changed to Central Park Drifter (IMDB info). Supporting roles included Coronor (Michael Bokner), Detective Winsome (John Haslett Cuff), Detective Smith (Don James), and Officer Arbus (Lesley Kelly). Jerry Ciccoritti was nominated for Best Film at the Sitges - Catalonian International Film Festival.

Synopsis
Night brings out the hunger in people, especially a mysterious NY cab driver. He is a powerful vampire. And working the night shift brings a sultry array of sensuous passengers within his grasp. Embracing those ready to die, he controls an erratic but well-balanced vampire realm. Then unexpectedly, he discovers erotic human passion-unleashing a raging, terrorizing evil. When a slew of innocent citizens are senselessly slaughtered, the baffled police must solve a 350 year old mystery of unsated passion.

Cast
Michael A. Miranda (credited as Silvio Oliviero) as Stephen Tsepes
Helen Papas as Michelle Hayden
Cliff Stoker as Eric Hayden
Dorin Ferber as Gilda
Dan Rose as Robert Kopple 
John Haslett Cuff as Det. Winsome
Don James as Det. Smith
Michael Bokner as Coronor
Lesley Kelly as Officer Arbus
Martin Bockner as Shlr Digger
Frank Procopio as Marlo Bava
Kim Cayer as Suzy
Sugar Bouche as Fabulous Franne
Jessie Taylor as Swimming Pool Blonde
Ron Bacardi as Guy in Strip Joint
Courtland Elliot as Junkyard Nightwatchman

Sequel
The film spawned a sequel, The Understudy: Graveyard Shift II, also starring Michael A. Miranda.

External links
 

1987 films
1987 horror films
Canadian supernatural horror films
English-language Canadian films
1980s English-language films
Films shot in Toronto
Canadian independent films
Canadian vampire films
Films scored by Nicholas Pike
1980s Canadian films
1980s supernatural horror films
1987 independent films